A corvette is a warship smaller than a frigate.

Corvette may also refer to:

 Aérospatiale Corvette, a business jet
 Chevrolet Corvette, a sports car
 Corellian Corvette, a small ship from Star Wars
 Corvette (bicycle), a model produced from 1954 until 1964 
 Corvette (pinball), a 1994 arcade machine
 Corvette (video game), a racing video game
 Corvette 31, a 1966 Canadian sailboat design
 Corvette (computer), a Soviet computer from the 1980s

See also
 
 Korvettes, American chain of discount department stores